Theodor Janisch (1 February 1902 – 1940) was an Austrian sports shooter. He competed in the 50 m rifle event at the 1936 Summer Olympics.

References

1902 births
1940 deaths
Austrian male sport shooters
Olympic shooters of Austria
Shooters at the 1936 Summer Olympics
Place of birth missing